Hans Keller (born March 24, 1944) is a retired Swiss professional ice hockey player who played for Zürcher SC in the National League A.  He also represented the Swiss national team at the 1972 Winter Olympics.

References

External links
Hans Keller's stats at Sports-Reference.com

1944 births
Living people
Ice hockey players at the 1972 Winter Olympics
Olympic ice hockey players of Switzerland
Swiss ice hockey forwards
ZSC Lions players